Abdelkrim Mameri (born January 12, 1981, in Boufarik) is an Algerian football player who is currently playing as a defender for ES Sétif in the Algerian Ligue Professionnelle 1.

Mameri captained CRB to its sixth Algerian Cup title in 2009.

References

External links
 Profile at El Boutoula
 DZFoot Profile

1981 births
Living people
People from Boufarik
Algerian footballers
CR Belouizdad players
ES Sétif players
Algerian Ligue Professionnelle 1 players
Association football defenders
WA Boufarik players
21st-century Algerian people